Revival's in the Air (stylized in capital letters) is the twelfth live album by California-based worship collective Bethel Music, and their twentieth full-length release overall. The album was released through the collective's imprint label, Bethel Music, on May 29, 2020. The featured worship leaders on the album are Brian Johnson, Jenn Johnson, Cory Asbury, Jonathan David & Melissa Helser, Josh Baldwin, Kristene DiMarco, Paul McClure, Hannah McClure, Brandon Lake, Bethany Wohrle, and Dante Bowe. Brian Johnson and Joel Taylor produced the album, working with assistant producers David Whitworth, John-Paul Gentile and Matthew Ogden.

The album was supported by five singles: "God of Revival", "We Praise You", "Egypt", "Champion" and "Revival's in the Air".

Revival's in the Air became a commercially successful album upon its release, debuting at No. 2 on Billboard's Top Christian Albums Chart in the United States, and at No. 3 on the Official Charts' Official Christian & Gospel Albums Chart in the United Kingdom. Revival's in the Air received nominations for the GMA Dove Award Worship Album of the Year and Recorded Music Packaging of the Year at the 2021 GMA Dove Awards.

Background

On February 3, 2020, Bethel Music initially announced the title of the album as God of Revival, with the then-intended title track, "God of Revival", set to be released as the lead single to the album on February 7, 2020, concurrently revealing the cover artwork, and availing the song for pre-save on Spotify. On May 11, 2020, Bethel Music announced that the album was renamed to Revival's in the Air, with the release date slated for May 29, 2020.

Brian Johnson spoke about the changes in the album's creative direction, saying that the album initially began with the theme 'God of Revival' and tried to make changes in response to what God was saying, though kept returning to the theme of 'Revival'. The name Revival's in the Air was said to be inspired by the album's title track, a song penned by Jonathan David & Melissa Helser with their son, Cadence.

Release and promotion

Singles
On February 7, 2020, the album's lead single, "God of Revival", was released digitally on music stores and streaming services, along with the accompanying music video. The single peaked at number thirty-one on the US Hot Christian Songs.

"We Praise You" was released digitally on music stores and streaming services along with the accompanying music video, on March 6, 2020, as the album's second single.

"Egypt" was released digitally on music stores and streaming services along with the accompanying music video, on April 6, as the album's third single. The song peaked at number thirty-eight on the US Hot Christian Songs.

The studio-recorded version of "Champion" was released in digital format on July 17, 2020.

The studio-recorded version of "Revival's in the Air" was released in digital format on September 4, 2020.

Promotional singles
On May 11, 2020, Bethel Music revealed the release date of the album to be May 29, and shared that they will release the fourth song from the album on May 15, 2020, followed by the release of additional tracks starting May 25, with the release of a new song being availed each day till the release date. On May 15, 2020, Bethel Music launched the album's pre-order with the release of "Champion", along with the song's accompanying music video. "Champion" debuted at number 32 on the US Hot Christian Songs chart.

On May 25, 2020, Bethel Music released "Come Out of that Grave (Resurrection Power)" as the first of four cascading singles towards the album's release, with the accompanying music video. Bethel Music also revealed that "Anything Is Possible", "Reign Above It All" and "Revival's in the Air" would be the other singles to be released during on each day leading up to the album's release in that respective order. "Anything Is Possible" was released on May 26, followed by "Reign Above It All" on May 27, and ending the album's pre-order period with the release of "Revival's in the Air" on May 28, along with the accompanying music videos for the songs.

Reception

Critical response

Hallel's Timothy Yap applauded Bethel Music in his review of the album, describing the album as a collection of "well-crafted pop worship anthems quipped with strong hooks and distinctive melodies." Yap arrived at this conclusion about the album: "From start to finish, there's not a weak moment on the record. "Revival's in the Air" is easily Bethel Music's best record to date."

Accolades

Commercial performance
In the United States, Revival's in the Air debuted on the Billboard Top Christian Albums chart at number two, having earned 5,000 equivalent album units in the first week of sales.

Revival's in the Air also debuted in the top five on the OCC's Official Christian & Gospel Albums Chart in the United Kingdom, launching at number three in the week ending June 11, 2020.

Track listing

 Songwriting credits adapted from PraiseCharts.

Charts

Weekly charts

Year-end charts

Release history

References

External links
 

2020 albums
Bethel Music albums